Modbury is a large village, ecclesiastical parish, civil parish and former manor situated in the South Hams district of the county of Devon in England. Today due to its large size it is generally referred to as a "town" although the parish council has not elected to give itself the status of a town as it could do under s.245(6) of the Local Government Act 1972, so it does not have a town council and cannot have a town mayor. It is also known informally as a "market town", as from at least 1199 the lord of the manor has held the right to hold a regular market. The village is situated on the A379 road, which links it to Plymouth and Kingsbridge. The current parish population is approximately 1,500.

Etymology
The name Modbury is a corruption of the Anglo-Saxon name, Moot burgh from 'Moot' meaning either 'Mud' or 'meeting' and 'bury' meaning 'fortified enclosure'.

History
Modbury is recorded in the Domesday Book of 1086. It has had permission to hold a weekly fair since before 1199. The population of the town was greatly reduced as a consequence of the Black Death in the 14th century.

Civil war
Modbury was the site of two battles in the English Civil War. The first battle was a surprise attack by a mounted Parliamentarian force led by Sir William Ruthven that moved under cover of darkness from Plymouth via Ivybridge on 7 December 1642. In the early morning charge they routed a mostly untrained Royalist force that had gathered in the town, where Sir Ralph Hopton, the King's senior commander in the West Country, was holding council at the manor house of Champernowne Court. The house was badly damaged by fire, Hopton escaped but many notable Devon Royalists were captured.

The second Battle of Modbury occurred on 22 February 1643 when the Royalists forces, expecting an attack by Parliamentarian forces assembled at nearby Kingsbridge, had fortified the town. Outnumbered approximately four to one, and running short of ammunition, the royalists retreated. This victory was largely instrumental in the lifting of the Siege of Plymouth, and the driving of the encircling Royalist forces into Cornwall.

19th century
By 1801, the population of Modbury had risen to 1,813, with almost half engaged in the wool trade. The impact of the mechanisation of the wool industry was to have a dramatic effect on the economic prosperity and population of the town in the mid-1820s and later. Many workers left the town and headed to large cities in search of employment; others left the country altogether, emigrating to America.

The railway line bypassed Modbury, contributing still further to this decline. Modbury remained an important market town until as late as 1944 when the cattle market ceased.

Manor

The manor of Modbury was held from the time of the Domesday Book of 1086 by the Vautort family, and passed successively to the families of Okeston and Champernowne. In the Domesday Book is listed as two separate parts;  the principal one as Motbilie, one of the holdings of Robert, Count of Mortain, half-brother of William the Conqueror. Robert's tenant was one of his important Anglo-Norman followers, Reginald I de Vautort. Later, Sir Roger de Vautort granted the manor, together with Bridford, to Sir Alexander de Okeston, of Okeston (alias Oxton), Devon, the second husband of Joan de Vautort, widow of Ralph de Vautort, Sir Roger's elder brother. Joan de Vautort was the mistress of Richard, 1st Earl of Cornwall (1209–1272), second son of King John. By Okeston she had a son Sir James Okeston, who before he died childless named as his heir the son of his half-sister Joan, daughter of Earl Richard and wife of Richard Champernowne of Clyst Champernowne, near Exeter, Devon. The Champernown family was thenceforth seated at Modbury. Sir James Okeston (son of Sir Alexander de Okeston) granted Bridford
to Richard Champernowne, as evidenced in a deed dated 1314

The manor house, last occupied by the Champernowne family and known as "Court House", was situated on the north side of the parish church of St George, on or near the site of Modbury Priory, founded in the 12th century by the Vautort lords of the manor. It was destroyed during the Civil War (1642–1651) and the remnants were sold for building materials in 1705.

Church 
The parish Church of St George is Grade 1 listed. The main body of the church is fourteenth century and is constructed of coursed rubble with granite dressings beneath slate roofs. The tower has angle buttresses and a broach spire believed to have been struck by lightning in AD 1621 and rebuilt as a copy of the original. The nave has a wagon roof, as do the aisles and transepts, the Lady Chapel, the Vestry, and the chancel. Dendrochronological analysis suggest the church was reroofed in the sixteenth century. The church was placed on Historic England's Heritage at Risk Register in 2013 with concerns about roof damage and damp. A 2015 Heritage Lottery Fund grant led to an extensive programme of roof repairs and restoration.

Historic estates

Little Modbury
The estate of Little Modbury, formerly owned by the le Rouse (le Rous) Family, was subdivided in the 18th century, and now is just a locale south of the village, although Little Modbury Farm still maintains the name.

Orcheton
Orcheton within the parish was long a seat of the Prideaux family. The much mutilated effigy survives in the Orcheton (or Prideaux) aisle of Modbury Church of Sir John Prideaux (c.1347-1403) of Orcheton, twice a Member of Parliament for Devon in 1383 and 1388.

Shilstone
In the parish, just outside the village of Modbury, is Shilstone Manor, a restored Georgian manor house on the estate of Silfestana, a property listed in the Doomsday Book, also known as "Shivelston". At the time of the Doomsday Book it was in the demise of Osbern de Salceid. The Hill family (originally "de la Hille") owned the estate from the late 14th century, notably Judge Robert Hill and his son Robert Hill II, Sheriff of Devonshire, until around 1614 when the fortunes of that branch of the Hill family had declined, the estate was acquired by the Savery family, whose members included members of Parliament, and who were engaged in both farming and trade.

In the 20th century the house had fallen into disrepair and was being used as a farmhouse. In the early 2000s it was restored to its Georgian glory. The restoration won several awards including Country Life's ‘Restoration of the Century’ award and The Georgian Group's ‘New Building in the Classical Tradition’ award for restoring the "1800 remodelling of mediaeval house". The historic gardens at Shilstone have also been restored.

The English inventor, Thomas Savery, was born about 1650 at the old medieval manor at Shilstone.

Wympston
Whympston (Wimpston) in the parish of Modbury is a historic manor. King John granted the estate to John Fortescue in 1209. It became the earliest English seat of the prominent Norman family of Fortescue, influential in British and West Country history, which survives today as Earl Fortescue, seated in Gloucestershire, but until recently seated at Castle Hill in Devon.

Yarnacombe
Yarnacombe in the parish of Modbury is a historic manor, once belonging to the Hart Family, and subsequently to the attorney W. Mackworth Praed.

Plastic bag ban
In April 2007 local traders declared that for environmental reasons, they would no longer give customers plastic bags. This initiative led to other communities, such as Ilam in Staffordshire and Hebden Bridge in West Yorkshire, pursuing similar enterprises.

Modbury Rovers Junior F.C.
Modbury has a recreation field with a football pitch, tennis courts and a tarmac all-weather surface used mainly for skateboarding. This is the home of Modbury Rovers a Junior football club, who compete in the FA Pioneer Youth and other local leagues.

Notable former residents
 Katherine 'Kat' Ashley née Champernowne (? – 1565) governess to Elizabeth I was probably born in or near the village
 Sir George Baker, 1st Baronet, FRS, FSA (1 January 1722 – 15 June 1809), physician to King George III, was born in the town
 William Battie (sometimes spelt Batty), president of the Royal College of Physicians in 1764 was born in the town
Thomas Savery (c. 1650 – 15 May 1715) inventor of the first commercially used steam-powered device, a steam pump, was born at Shilstone

See also
 Modbury Priory

Notes

References

External links
 Visit Modbury – Shops and Businesses
 Modbury Heritage
 Modbury Information
 Modbury News
 Aerial photo of Modbury in 1930, part of a series

Civil parishes in South Hams
Villages in Devon